Northampton services is a motorway service station off the M1 motorway and A43 interchange near Northampton, England. It is owned by Roadchef, and used to be called Rothersthorpe.

History
When first opened, Rothersthorpe Services (as it was then known) was located between junctions, an 'online' service area. However, in 1991 the Blisworth Bypass on the A43 was opened, this linked into the M1 at the Rothersthorpe site, creating a junction surrounding the site.

The footbridge was taken out of use in 2002 when the site was redeveloped, though it still remains in place.

Location

Northampton services are located at junction 15A of the M1 at a junction with the A43, because of the way the service area has evolved, it is possible to reach and exit the services without negotiating the main junction, but uniquely it is also possible to access the service area on the opposite carriageway legally.

References

External links
Motorway Services Online - Northampton

M1 motorway service stations
RoadChef motorway service stations